Ondřej Smetana is a Czech racing driver currently participating in the European Rallycross Championship, in the Super 1600 category.

Racing record

Complete FIA European Rallycross Championship results

Division 1A

Super1600

References

Living people
Year of birth missing (living people)
Czech rally drivers
Czech racing drivers
European Rallycross Championship drivers